Sabatier is a small lunar impact crater that is located near the eastern limb of the Moon, at the southwestern fringes of the Mare Marginis.

It lies in a relatively isolated area, with the nearest named crater being the walled plain Neper to the southeast. This is a nearly circular formation, with a low outer rim and a circular floor about half the crater's diameter.

References

 
 
 
 
 
 
 
 
 
 
 
 

Impact craters on the Moon